Bomarea hartwegii is a species of flowering plant in the family Alstroemeriaceae. It is native to Peru and to Ecuador, where it has only been collected twice, in the Pichincha Province. It is threatened by habitat destruction.

References

Flora of Ecuador
Flora of Peru
hartwegii
Plants described in 1882
Critically endangered plants
Taxonomy articles created by Polbot
Taxa named by John Gilbert Baker